The 2020 United States House of Representatives election in Wyoming was held on November 3, 2020, to elect the U.S. representative from Wyoming's at-large congressional district. The election coincided with the 2020 U.S. presidential election, as well as other elections to the House of Representatives, elections to the United States Senate and various state and local elections.

Republican primary

Candidates

Nominee
 Liz Cheney, incumbent U.S. Representative

Eliminated in primary
 Blake Stanley, rancher

Endorsements

Results

Democratic primary

Candidates

Nominee
Lynnette Grey Bull, activist and member of the Northern Arapaho tribe

Eliminated in primary
Carl Beach, international educator
Carol Hafner, retired educator and progressive activist

Declined
Dave Freudenthal, former Governor of Wyoming

Endorsements

Results

General election

Debates
Complete video of debate, October 8, 2020

Predictions

Polling

Results

Counties that flipped from Democratic to Republican
 Albany (largest municipality: Laramie)

Notes

References

External links
 
 
  (State affiliate of the U.S. League of Women Voters)
 

Official campaign websites
 Liz Cheney (R) for Congress
 Lynnette Grey Bull (D) for Congress 
 Jeff Haggit (C) for Congress

Wyoming
2020
House